Barillet is a surname. Notable people with the surname include: 

Louis Barillet (1880–1948), French artist, known for his work in stained glass
Pierre Barillet (1923–2019), French playwright

See also
Baillet